Zig Zag was a Canadian children's television series.

It was produced by BCTV (now Global BC) in Vancouver, British Columbia from 1979-1988.  Among the hosts of the series were Terry David Mulligan, Susanne McLellan, Valri Bromfield, Mairlyn Smith, Bill Reiter, and Rick Ducommun. Norm Grohmann, Nicola Cavendish, and Ryan Stiles also made regular appearances on the show.

One segment of the show was The Biff and Bart Show, which originally started out only as a two-minute "filler" segment, but as the years went by it ultimately took over the whole program.

References

External links

1979 Canadian television series debuts
1988 Canadian television series endings
1970s Canadian children's television series
1980s Canadian children's television series
English-language television shows